Castro Peak, at , is the highest peak in the middle part of the Santa Monica Mountains and is in the Santa Monica Mountains National Recreation Area. The town of Malibu is located to the southeast of the peak.

The fire lookout tower that was once located on Castro Peak has been moved to Henninger Flats in the San Gabriel Mountains for display.

See also
Santa Monica Mountains topics index
 Angeles National Forest Fire Lookout Association

References

External links 
 

Santa Monica Mountains
Mountains of Los Angeles County, California
Mountains of Southern California